Roberto Víctor Gerlein Echeverría (18 November 1938 – 23 December 2021) was a Colombian lawyer and politician. A Conservative party politician, he was the longest-serving and most senior Member of the Senate of Colombia having been first elected in 1974. During his long political career, he served also as a Member of the Chamber of Representatives (1968–1974), as the 10th Colombian Minister of Economic Development, and as the 42nd Governor of Atlántico. He died in Barranquilla on 23 December 2021, at the age of 83.

Selected works

See also
Fuad Ricardo Char Abdala
José Name Terán

References

Further reading

External links

1938 births
2021 deaths
People from Barranquilla
Pontifical Xavierian University alumni
20th-century Colombian lawyers
Colombian Conservative Party politicians
Governors of Atlántico Department
Colombian Ministers of Economic Development
Members of the Chamber of Representatives of Colombia
Members of the Senate of Colombia